The 1890 West Cavan by-election was a parliamentary by-election held for the United Kingdom House of Commons constituency of West Cavan on 26 March 1890. The election was caused by the death of the sitting member, Joseph Biggar of the Irish National Federation. Only one candidate was nominated, Edmund Vesey Knox of the Irish National Federation, and was elected unopposed.

References

1890 elections in the United Kingdom
March 1890 events
By-elections to the Parliament of the United Kingdom in County Cavan constituencies
Unopposed by-elections to the Parliament of the United Kingdom in Irish constituencies
1890 elections in Ireland